Erbkrank is a 1936 Nazi propaganda film directed by Herbert Gerdes.

Erbkrank was one of six propagandistic movies produced by the NS-Rasse und Politisches Amt (National Socialist Racial and Political Office), from 1935 to 1937 to demonize people in Germany diagnosed with mental illness and mental retardation. The goal was to gain public support for the T-4 Euthanasia Program then in preparation. This film, as the others, featured footage of patients in German psychiatric hospitals.

Adolf Hitler reportedly liked the film so much that he encouraged the production of the full-length film Victims of the Past: The Sin against Blood and Race. In 1937, Erbkrank was reportedly showing in nearly all Berlin film theaters.

Prior to World War II, the film was distributed in America through the Pioneer Fund.

Notes and references

See also
 Alles Leben ist Kampf
 Das Erbe
 Opfer der Vergangenheit
 Euthanasia
 List of German films 1933–1945
 Nazism and cinema

External links
 
 Erbkrank via cine-holocaust
 Erbkrank via Internet Archive

1936 documentary films
1936 films
Films directed by Herbert Gerdes
German black-and-white films
German documentary films
1930s German films